The 1994 MTV Movie Awards was hosted by Will Smith. Performers included Bon Jovi, Nate Dogg & Warren G., Toni Braxton and John Mellencamp with Me'Shell NdegeOcello. In addition, the supergroup Backbeat featuring Mike Mills of R.E.M., Dave Grohl of Nirvana, Dave Pirner of Soul Asylum, Thurston Moore of Sonic Youth, Don Fleming of Gumball, and Greg Dulli of Afghan Whigs.

Performers
Bon Jovi — "Good Guys Don't Always Wear White"
Nate Dogg and Warren G — "Regulate"
Toni Braxton — "You Mean the World to Me"
Toby Huss — "Best Song from a Movie Medley"
John Mellencamp with Me'Shell Ndegeocello — "Wild Night"
The Backbeat Band featuring Mike Mills of R.E.M., Dave Grohl of Nirvana, Dave Pirner of Soul Asylum, Thurston Moore of Sonic Youth, Don Fleming of Gumball and Greg Dulli of Afghan Whigs — "Money (That's What I Want)/Long Tall Sally" and "Helter Skelter"

Awards

Best Movie 
Menace II Society
The Fugitive
Jurassic Park
Philadelphia
Schindler's List

Best Male Performance
Tom Hanks – Philadelphia
Tom Cruise – The Firm
Harrison Ford – The Fugitive
Val Kilmer – Tombstone
Robin Williams – Mrs. Doubtfire

Best Female Performance
Janet Jackson – Poetic Justice
Angela Bassett – What's Love Got to Do with It
Demi Moore – Indecent Proposal
Julia Roberts – The Pelican Brief
Meg Ryan – Sleepless in Seattle

Most Desirable Male
William Baldwin – Sliver
Tom Cruise – The Firm
Val Kilmer – Tombstone
Jean-Claude Van Damme – Hard Target
Denzel Washington – The Pelican Brief

Most Desirable Female
Janet Jackson – Poetic Justice
Kim Basinger – The Getaway
Demi Moore – Indecent Proposal
Alicia Silverstone – The Crush
Sharon Stone – Sliver

Breakthrough Performance
Alicia Silverstone – The Crush
Ralph Fiennes – Schindler's List
Jason Scott Lee – Dragon: The Bruce Lee Story
Ross Malinger – Sleepless in Seattle
Jason James Richter – Free Willy

Best On-Screen Duo
Harrison Ford and Tommy Lee Jones – The Fugitive
Mary Stuart Masterson and Johnny Depp – Benny & Joon
Tom Hanks and Denzel Washington – Philadelphia
Meg Ryan and Tom Hanks – Sleepless in Seattle
Dana Carvey and Mike Myers – Wayne's World 2

Best Villain
Alicia Silverstone – The Crush
Macaulay Culkin – The Good Son
John Malkovich – In the Line of Fire
Wesley Snipes – Demolition Man
T. Rex – Jurassic Park

Best Comedic Performance
Robin Williams – Mrs. Doubtfire
Jim Carrey – Ace Ventura: Pet Detective
Johnny Depp – Benny & Joon
Whoopi Goldberg – Sister Act 2: Back in the Habit
Pauly Shore – Son In Law

Best Song from a Movie
Michael Jackson — "Will You Be There" (from Free Willy)
Bryan Adams, Rod Stewart and Sting — "All for Love" (from The Three Musketeers)
UB40 — "Can't Help Falling in Love" (from Sliver)
The Proclaimers — "I'm Gonna Be (500 Miles)" (from Benny & Joon)
Bruce Springsteen — "Streets of Philadelphia" (from Philadelphia)
Céline Dion and Clive Griffin — "When I Fall in Love" (from Sleepless in Seattle)

Best Kiss
Demi Moore and Woody Harrelson – Indecent Proposal
Patricia Arquette and Christian Slater – True Romance
Kim Basinger and Dana Carvey – Wayne's World 2
Jason James Richter and Willy – Free Willy
Winona Ryder and Ethan Hawke – Reality Bites

Best Action Sequence
Train Wreck – The Fugitive
Opening Catwalk Sequence – Cliffhanger
Motorcycle Scene – Hard Target
T-Rex/Jeep Scene – Jurassic Park
Lena Olin Handcuffed in Backseat of Car – Romeo Is Bleeding

Best New Filmmaker
Steve Zaillian – Searching for Bobby Fischer

Lifetime Achievement Award
Richard Roundtree – Shaft

References

 1994
Mtv Movie Awards